Warren French (born 26 March 1963) is a former New Zealand professional darts player. He lives in Ashburton and uses the nickname Frog for his matches.

Career

French reached the final of the 2006 New Zealand Open, losing to former world champion Tony David. He played in the 2007 PDC World Darts Championship, losing 3–1 in the first round to James Wade. French won the 2008 New Zealand National Championship which earned him a place in the 2009 PDC World Darts Championship. He won his preliminary match against Japan's national champion Akihiro Nagakawa and was then trounced 3–0 by Dennis Priestley in the first round.

The match with Nagakawa is widely considered to be the worst match ever in the history of either the PDC or BDO World Championships, where both players averaged 54. The standard was so poor, that Sky Sports stopped broadcasting it halfway through.

French qualified for the 2012 PDC World Darts Championship. He played the Republic of Ireland's Connie Finnan in the preliminary round, and won 4–3 with an average of 85.88, a vast improvement on his 2009 performance. French played Mark Walsh in the first round and, although he won the first set, would go on to lose the match 1–3. French represented New Zealand with Preston Ridd in the 2012 PDC World Cup of Darts and  together they were beaten 3–5 by Austria in the first round.

World Championship results

PDC

2007: First round (lost to James Wade 1–3) (sets) 
2009: First round (lost to Dennis Priestley 0–3)
2012: First round (lost to Mark Walsh 1–3)

References

External links

 http://www.pdc.tv/page/WorldChampsDetail/0,,10180~1494376,00.html

New Zealand darts players
Living people
1963 births
Sportspeople from Ashburton, New Zealand 
Professional Darts Corporation associate players
PDC World Cup of Darts team New Zealand